Yar Ali Khan was a Member of the 4th National Assembly of Pakistan as a representative of East Pakistan.

Career
Khan was a Member of the  4th National Assembly of Pakistan representing Chittagong-IV. Rajakhali Yar Ali Khan Ideal High School, established in 1966, was named after him in Cox's Bazar District, Chittagong Division.

References

Pakistani MNAs 1965–1969
Living people
Year of birth missing (living people)